Jim Axelrod (born January 25, 1963) is the Chief Investigative Correspondent for CBS News and reports across all CBS News programs and platforms.

Axelrod was one of CBS News' embedded correspondents in Iraq and was the first TV reporter to broadcast live from Saddam International Airport (now Baghdad International Airport) after its takeover by American forces.

Biography
Axelrod was born on January 25, 1963, to a Jewish family in New Brunswick, New Jersey. Raised in Highland Park, New Jersey, he attended Highland Park High School. He received a B.A. in 1985 from Cornell University in history and an M.A. in 1989 from Brown University, also with a major in history. He began his career in journalism at WVII-TV in Bangor, ME in 1989. Before joining CBS, he was a general assignment and political reporter at WRAL-TV in Raleigh, North Carolina. Before WRAL, Axelrod also worked at WSTM-TV Syracuse, NY and WUTR-TV Utica, NY.  Axelrod resides in Montclair, New Jersey, with his wife and their three children.

References

1963 births
Living people
American reporters and correspondents
CBS News people
Highland Park High School (New Jersey) alumni
People from Highland Park, New Jersey
People from Montclair, New Jersey
People from New Brunswick, New Jersey
Journalists from New Jersey
Cornell University alumni
Brown University alumni
Jewish American journalists
21st-century American Jews